Grazioso is a ballet made on New York City Ballet by Peter Martins, its balletmaster-in-chief, to music by Mikhail Glinka. The premiere took place at City Ballet's fall gala on Tuesday, November 20, 2007 at the New York State Theater, Lincoln Center.

Music

  
 A Life for the Tsar, Act II
 Mazurka
 Pas de Quatre
 Cracovienne 
 
 Ruslan and Ludmila, Act III
 Pas de Trois

Original cast
Ashley Bouder
Gonzalo Garcia  
Daniel Ulbricht  
Andrew Veyette

References 
Repertory Week, NYCB, Fall season, 2010 repertory, week 1
Playbill, NYCB, Tuesday, September 14, 2010

Reviews 

  
NY Times by Jennifer Dunning, November 22, 2007

Ballets by Peter Martins
Ballets to the music of Mikhail Glinka
Ballets designed by Holly Hynes
2007 ballet premieres
New York City Ballet repertory